Chloroclystis macroaedeagus is a moth in the family Geometridae. It is found on New Caledonia.

References

Moths described in 1979
Chloroclystis
Moths of Oceania